Long Lake is a census-designated place (CDP) in the town of Long Lake, Hamilton County, New York, United States. The population was 596 at the 2020 census, out of 791 in the town of Long Lake as a whole.

Long Lake is within the Adirondack Park.

Geography
The community is located in the northeastern part of Hamilton County, surrounding the southwestern half of the water body Long Lake. The center of the community is on the southeastern side of the lake, where New York State Route 30 crosses. The community extends southwest along Long Lake to include the hamlet of Deerland. Route 30 leads north  to Tupper Lake, and south  to Blue Mountain Lake. New York State Route 28N runs east from Long Lake  to Newcomb, and south with Route 30 to Blue Mountain Lake.

Long Lake, the water body, runs northeastward from the Long Lake CDP and is drained by the Raquette River, a northward-flowing tributary of the St. Lawrence River.

References

Census-designated places in New York (state)
Census-designated places in Hamilton County, New York
Adirondacks